Alwynne Pritchard (born 1968) is a British performer, composer, artist and curator based in Bergen, Norway. She has also developed choreography for performances of her own pieces. She is co-founder of the music-theatre company Neither Nor  and former artistic director of the BIT20 ensemble.

Pritchard was born in Glasgow. From 2008 and until March 2014, she was artistic director of the Borealis Festival in Bergen, and from 2001 until 2008, she taught composition at  Trinity College of Music in London. Pritchard also worked for many years as a freelance writer and presenter for BBC Radio 3 including Music in Our Time, Midnight Oil, Music Matters, Hear and Now, and Discovering Music. In January 2016, she took up the position of artistic director of the BIT20 Ensemble.

Her father is the composer Gwyn Pritchard.

Orchestral music
 Rockaby (2016); 12 mins; orchestra, live foley, vocal/physical performer
 Critical Mass (2003); 22 mins; orchestra and tape
 Map of the Moon (2004); 20 mins; piano and orchestra
 World Enough (in two movements) (2005); 1 second; orchestra

Chamber music 
Kingdom Come (2014); 20 mins; 3 voc, hrm, electronics
March March March (2013); 6 mins; 2fl, ob, 6cl, bsn, alt sax, ten sax, bar sax, 3hn, 3tpt, 3trb, 1euph, 2tba, 3perc
In Nomine (2006); 3 mins; fl, ob, bcl, pno, vn, va, vc
Decoy (2004); 17 mins; fl, ob, cl, vn, va, vc, perc, live electronics
Word Play (2004); 12 mins; picc, fl, cl, sop sax, bar sax, 2hn, tpt, 2tbn, perc, elec bass, vc. pf
Geometry of Pain I (2002); 10 mins; voice, vc, gtr, amplification
Impossibility (2001); 14 mins; speaker with spoons, cl/bcl, egui, vc
Quintet (Barbara Allen) (2000); 10 mins; 2vn, va, vc, pf
Der Glücklose Engel (1999); 10 mins; ecl, vn, vc
Craw (1997); 7 mins; fl, ob, cl, bn, hn, tpt, trb, pf, 2vn, va, vc
What This Night (1997); 10 mins; ob, cl, accordion, perc, harp, 2pf
Nocturnal (1995); 8 mins; 2vn, va, vc
Glimpsed Most Clearly From The Corner Of Your Eye (1992); 5 mins; 7vc

Solos and duos
Irene Electric (2013); 15 mins; amplified violin & tape
Graffiti (2007); 13 mins; perc, electronics
Zero (2006); 9 mins; fl/picc/bfl, acc
To the Ground (2005); 11 mins; violin, computer
Matrix (2001); c. 13 mins; vn
Nostos Ou Topos II (2000); 7 mins; gtr
Kit (1999); c. 10 mins; voice, any instrument
Danaides (1996); 6 mins; vc, tape
Chiaroscuro (1995); 14 mins; trb, pf
From this deposit a transparent bubble comes to the surface at certain times and explodes gently on reaching his lips (1994); 8 mins; bcl
Une Mort Héroïque (1993); 9 mins; speaker (tape), va

Piano
Heart of Glass (2019)
Loser (2014/16); 10 mins
Geometry of Pain II (2003); 12mins; Piano and Video
The Barnyard Song (2003); 3 mins; (for Elena Riu's Little Book of Salsa)
Invisible Cities (1999); 7-15 mins
Der Zwerg (1998); 10 mins
Mesarch (1997); 5mins
So ist mein Jesus nun gefangen (1993); 5 mins; (Transcription after Bach)
Spring (1996); 1 min

Vocal
Wir kommen und wir gehen (with Christian Jendreiko) (2016); choir
Piece for girls’ choir (with Amnon Wolman) (2016); female choir
havi ikki pláss fyri fleiri eygum (2014) 4 mins 45 secs; S.S.A.A.T.T.B.B.
As in Heaven (2007); 21/2 mins; S.S.A.Bar.T.B
Homecoming (2003); 20 mins; 5 amplified sopranos, electronics
Le Crépuscule du Soir (1996); 14 mins; sop, pf

Music theatre
Vitality Forms 6 (2016); 7-10 mins; vocal/physical performer
Vitality Forms 5 (2016); 7-10 mins; vocal/physical performer
Homing (2015); 20 mins; 3 vocal performers, electronics + 21 physical performers
Vitality Forms 4 (2015); 7-10 mins; vocal/physical performer
Vitality Forms 3 (2015); 7-10 mins; vocal/physical performer
Vitality Forms 2 (2015); 10 mins; mixed ensemble min 5 players + 3 vocal & 3 facial performers
Vitality Forms 1 (2015); 7-10 mins; vocal/physical performer
Hospice Lazy (2014); 60 mins; pf, vn, vc, electronics + physical performer
Erika married the Eiffel Tower (2013); 20 mins; fl, ob, bass cl, 2 pianists/1 piano, vn, va, vc, video
Oh no love, you're not alone (2013); 15 mins; voice, pf, vn, vc, video
Objects of Desire (2010); 15 mins; pno, vn, va + 3 additional performers
Oslo Emmaus (2010); 18 mins; sop, alt, pf, video
Source of Energy, Routes of Power (2010); 15 mins; ob, 2 voices, pf, vn
Flutterby (2009); 15 mins; e-gtr, 2 computers
Don't touch me, you don't know where I’ve been (2008); Music Drama; 35 mins; fl/picc, cl/bcl, voice, perc, pf, gtr, electronics
Frame (2007); Music Drama; 15 mins; picc, ob, cl, bn, hn, tpt, tbn, perc, harp, gtr, vn, va, vc, db, video (2 screens), electronics
Heroic Death – Une Mort Héroïque revised (1998); 20 mins; Chamber Opera; 2sop, bar, vc

Theatre
Hamlet Machine (with Thorolf Thuestad) (2016); music and sound design for the Scènes Théâtre Cinéma/Neither Nor production of Heiner Müller's Hamlet Machine

Installations
A Cognitive Theory of Metaphor (2009) (with Thorolf Thuestad)
Don't touch me, you don't know where I’ve been (2008) (installation version, with Thorolf Thuestad)

Educational and amateur
 Thor Sleeps (2004); 7 mins; for any 4 instruments and at least one pair of hands
 Barbara Allen (Fragments of a Lament) (2000); 4 or 8 mins; vn, vn (va), vc, db, pf

Transcriptions
 Höchster from Cantata BWV51 (2004); 10 mins; Transcription of Bach for soprano, accordion, vn, vc

References

External links
Maestro Arts
 Alwynne Pritchard official website
 Verlag Neue Musik
 Borealis Festival
 Integra
 Fat Battery
 Ding Dong
Review of Alwynnes Pritchards CD Rockaby
Review of Alwynne Pritchard's CD Invisible Cities
 Intervju med Alwynne Pritchard om Borealis Festival
 Amazon UK : Music by Alwynne Pritchard on sale
 Amazon Canada : Music by Alwynne Pritchard on sale
 Keda Shop : Subterfuge in Vitro
 Presto Classico
 Gwyn Pritchard official website

1968 births
20th-century classical composers
21st-century classical composers
BBC Radio 3 presenters
Women classical composers
Living people
Scottish classical composers
20th-century Scottish musicians
20th-century British composers
Scottish radio presenters
Scottish women radio presenters
20th-century women composers
21st-century women composers